Michelle Arthur is an English actress based in the United States. She has appeared in various television series, films, and video games. She is also known for her work with J. J. Abrams, appearing in Mission: Impossible III and episodes of Alias and Lost.

Career

Film
She appeared as the Thorpe Sisters in the 1987 film adaptation of Jane Austen's novel Northanger Abbey.  Arthur also appeared in the James Bond film GoldenEye (1995) as "Anna Nishkova". She has also appeared in the 1997 film Clockwatchers as "Dianne", in Seabiscuit (2003) as "Marcela's friend", in Steven Spielberg's The Terminal (2004).
She also starred in the 2005 remake of Fun With Dick and Jane as Dick's secretary and in Mission: Impossible III (another collaboration with Abrams) as an airline worker. She appeared in the 2011 film Thin Ice.

Television
On television, Arthur has guest starred in shows such as Leap of Faith as "Claudia", four episodes of Alias as "Abigail" (a third Abrams collaboration), three episodes of Lost as "Michelle the flight attendant" (a fourth collaboration with Abrams), two episodes of The Big Bang Theory as "Mrs Petrescu" and one episode of Grey's Anatomy as "Brooke".
She was set to appear in J. J. Abrams' television series The Catch as "Stella", before its cancellation by ABC. She was a regular cast member and writer on the comedy Head Case as Lola on the Starz network.

Voice work
Arthur has also lent her voice to several video games, including Armed & Dangerous, playing three characters - "Leper Boy", "Leper Woman" and "Lady of the Pond", as well as voicing characters in X-Men Legends (as Moira & Female Prisoner #3) and EverQuest II (as Smith Cayless Chambers, Merchant Tanaira and Vida Sweeps). She has also done the voice of Jote from Final Fantasy XII.

Filmography

Film

Television

Video games

External links
 
 

American film actresses
American television actresses
Place of birth missing (living people)
British emigrants to the United States
Living people
Year of birth missing (living people)
English television actresses
21st-century American women